The Villa Clara Provincial Museum, also known as Abel Santamaría Provincial Museum (Museo Provincial Abel Santamaría), is a museum located in the Cuban city of Santa Clara, capital of Villa Clara Province.

History
Originally, in the 19th century, the structure was a Spanish barrack called "María Cristina". At the end of the Cuban War of Independence, in 1898, it was abandoned until 1903, when the barracks became the seat of the rural guard and the headquarters of Las Villas Province, led by General José de Jesús Monteagudo, who in 1902 replaced the Major General Alejandro Rodríguez Velasco. It constituted, by its defensive capacity, the third military barracks of Cuba during the dictatorship of Fulgencio Batista. During the Battle of Santa Clara, in 1958, it was taken by the rebel troops led by Ernesto Guevara. In 1970 the structure was opened as provincial museum and, in 1981, renewed and expanded.

Structure
Part of the "Cultural Complex Abel Santamaría", it occupies its main building and is located over a hillock, in Dobarganes (Osvaldo Herrera) quarter. The museum counts a collection of art, social and natural history related to its province.

The museum halls include:
History Hall: it starts from the Cuban indigenous people (the Taínos) and continues, chronologically, to the Cuban Revolution, with an area dedicate to the Battle of Santa Clara. This hall includes a collection of various objects belonging to the Revolutionary Army.
Samuel Feijóo Hall: dedicated to the writer and painter born in San Juan de los Yeras, near Santa Clara, in 1914
Natural Science Hall: it includes several taxidermied species of the Cuban fauna
Culture Hall: it includes Neolithic ceramics, ceremonial bifacial axes, documents related to the cities of Santa Clara and Remedios, objects related to the Ten Years' War, and 1950s documents of the Cuban Revolution. There are also several paintings, as the ones of Armando Menocal and Aurelio Melero, inspired by Marta Abreu.

See also

List of museums in Cuba
Che Guevara Mausoleum
Tren Blindado

References

External links

 Villa Clara Provincial Museum 
 Villa Clara Provincial Provincial Museum on d-cuba.com

Buildings and structures in Santa Clara, Cuba
Museums in Cuba
Tourist attractions in Santa Clara, Cuba
Museums established in 1970
1970 establishments in Cuba
20th-century architecture in Cuba